Predrag Lazić (born 15 January 1982) is a Serbian professional footballer who plays as a winger for Radnički Obrenovac.

Career
In June 2006, Lazić signed a four-year contract with Partizan. He was loaned to Bežanija the following January. During his journeyman career, Lazić also spent five years abroad, playing for two Romanian and three Cypriot clubs.

Honours
BSK Borča
 Serbian League Belgrade: 2005–06
Radnik Surdulica
 Serbian First League: 2014–15

References

External links
 Srbijafudbal profile
 OFK Beograd profile
 
 

Aris Limassol FC players
Association football midfielders
Ayia Napa FC players
CS Otopeni players
CS Pandurii Târgu Jiu players
Cypriot First Division players
Ethnikos Achna FC players
Expatriate footballers in Cyprus
Expatriate footballers in Romania
First League of Serbia and Montenegro players
FK Bežanija players
FK BSK Borča players
FK Kolubara players
FK Mladi Obilić players
FK Napredak Kruševac players
FK Obilić players
FK Partizan players
FK Radnički Obrenovac players
FK Radnik Surdulica players
FK Sloboda Užice players
Kosovo Serbs
Liga I players
OFK Beograd players
Serbian expatriate footballers
Serbian expatriate sportspeople in Cyprus
Serbian expatriate sportspeople in Romania
Serbian First League players
Serbian footballers
Serbian SuperLiga players
Sportspeople from Pristina
1982 births
Living people